Raymond John "Chip" Cravaack is a U.S. Navy captain (retired), commercial airline pilot, high school teacher, and former Member of Congress who served in the United States House of Representatives for northeastern  from 2011 to 2013. In his first run for political office, he upset 18-term Democratic incumbent Jim Oberstar by a margin of 4,400 votes to become the first Republican since 1947 to represent the district. Previously, Cravaack was a pilot for Northwest Airlines, and before that, he was a Navy pilot and a graduate of the U.S. Naval Academy. He was defeated by DFL nominee Rick Nolan on November 6, 2012.

Early life and education
Cravaack was born in Charleston, West Virginia. His ancestry includes German, Italian, and Romanian-German. He grew up in the suburbs of Cincinnati, Ohio, the eldest of three children in a Republican family that had a military background; his father, Ray, served in the Korean War, and his grandfather served in World War I, as a motorcycle dispatch rider. Cravaack graduated from St. Xavier High School in 1977. He graduated from the United States Naval Academy in 1981 with a bachelor of science degree and a Master's of Education from the University of West Florida in 1989.

Military service
Following graduation, Cravaack served in the Navy as a helicopter pilot, fulfilling a childhood ambition. While in the Navy serving as a Flight Instructor in Pensacola Florida, he earned a Master of Education from the University of West Florida. After his release from active duty, he served in the Naval Reserve, serving with aircraft carrier crew augmentation units, the Navy Command Center at the Pentagon, CINCPAC Fleet in Hawaii, and ended his career serving with NATO, Supreme Allied Atlantic.  Cravaack retired in 2005 with the rank of Captain.

Northwest Airlines career
Cravaack moved to Minnesota and began working as a pilot for Northwest Airlines in 1990. He was out of work for two years in the early 1990s due to layoffs, during which time he became a simulator instructor for a subsidiary of Northwest Airlines teaching foreign pilots.

He was a union steward for the Airline Pilots Association. He served as a "strike coordinator" during the 1998 pilots' strike, bringing military discipline and parade-ground style marching to the picket lines.

Cravaack moved to New Hampshire after Congress to be with his sons, where he spent the last eight years before retirement as a teacher at Bishop Guertin High School, teaching U.S. History, Economics, and U.S. Government.

He is now retired and shuttles between the Winnipesaukee area in New Hampshire and the cradle of Naval Aviation, Pensacola, Florida.

U.S. House of Representatives

Elections
2010

Cravaack was inspired to run for Congress by a suggestion from a talk radio show host that voters demand town hall meetings with their congressmen during the health care bill Tea Party movement protests of August 2009. Cravaack went with 25 people to one of Oberstar's Minnesota offices asking for a meeting that day and when Oberstar did not come, Cravaack decided to challenge him in the November 2010 election.

Cravaack entered the race as a political novice and an underdog. The 8th had been in Democratic hands since 1947, and Oberstar was the longest-serving congressman in Minnesota's history, usually cruising to reelection. Geography also seemed to be against Cravaack; his home in Lindstrom was in Chisago County, in the southern portion of the district. His campaign manager was future Minnesota House of Representatives member Anne Neu.

According to the Star Tribune, Cravaack's campaign was "structured like a military operation". He toured the district in a motor home dubbed "The War Wagon," and gave volunteers ranks such as commander, captain, and precinct lieutenant. He discovered that his experience as a union steward attracted the interest of district voters, especially the miners.

Cravaack campaigned on a platform of free-market principles and government spending cuts. He attacked Oberstar's vote on the health care bill, saying he would vote to repeal and replace it, and called an Oberstar-approved extension of the Clean Water Act to include wet meadows a "land grab" by the federal government. Cravaack also criticized the earmark process that Oberstar had used to fund infrastructure projects in the district, saying it was time for the spending to stop, and attacked Oberstar's vote on "cap and trade" legislation to limit carbon emissions, saying it would result in higher energy prices. In his first ad, Cravaack paid homage to Oberstar's service, saying that he ran against Oberstar "with all due respect" but accusing him of having lost touch with the district.

The crowd jeered Oberstar at a candidate debate held in Duluth, and he called for a more civil atmosphere at the next debate. The second debate centered on economic issues. Cravaack argued that the 2003 Bush tax cuts should be continued in all tax brackets to stimulate employment, and Oberstar said he would end the tax cut for the top two percent of earners because the lowered tax had caused part of the deficit.

A poll conducted for KSTP-TV in the Twin Cities in October showed Oberstar ahead of Cravaack by only one point, 47 to 46 percent. Cravaack received the endorsement of former Speaker of the House Newt Gingrich as the polls tightened. He was also endorsed by Minnesota's largest anti-abortion organization, Minnesota Citizens Concerned for Life, and the largest newspaper in the district, the Duluth News Tribune. In the November 2 election, Cravaack scored one of the biggest upsets in Minnesota political history, defeating Oberstar by 4,400 votes, 48 percent to 47 percent. He believed the abortion issue was crucial to his victory; he had argued that Obamacare allowed for the payment of abortions with taxpayer funds and encouraged euthanasia for the elderly. By the time of the election, Cravaack characterized the bill as an example of socialized medicine that would result in the rationing of medical care.

2012

Cravaack was defeated by Democratic nominee Rick Nolan, a former U.S. Representative for the 6th district.

Tenure
Following his election in November 2010, Cravaack backed fellow Minnesota Representative Michele Bachmann for the number four GOP leadership position of House Republican Conference chair.

In March 2011, Cravaack came under criticism by Duluth students and community leaders for voting for a budget bill that made cuts to the federal Pell Grant program that provides financial aid to college students, including 30 percent of the students at the University of Minnesota Duluth. He also received attention for implying during a House Homeland Security Committee hearing that Los Angeles County Sheriff Lee Baca was furthering the goals of a terrorist organization.

In March 2012, Cravaack introduced a bill in Congress that would have allowed mining and logging in the Boundary Waters Canoe Area Wilderness and Superior National Forest through a land exchange that would rely on the state environmental review process and bypass federal environmental reviews, with proceeds going to the school districts.

He also sponsored a bill, which became law, that required the TSA to treat military personnel with respect while traveling on orders or in uniform. "The bill's intent, he said, is that the military personnel would be able to go through security with the same ease as registered flyers."

Cravaack opposed sequestration and voted against the Budget Control Act, saying, "You cut with a scalpel, not a meat ax."

In the 2012 election, Cravaack was endorsed by the Mesabi Daily News in Virginia and the Duluth News Tribune. On November 6, he lost by 9 points to the Democratic nominee, former congressman Rick Nolan.

Committee assignments
112th Congress
 Committee on Homeland Security
 Subcommittee on Counterterrorism and Intelligence
 Subcommittee on Transportation Security
 Committee on Transportation and Infrastructure
 Subcommittee on Aviation (Vice Chair)
 Subcommittee on Coast Guard and Maritime Transportation
 Subcommittee on Water Resources and Environment
 Committee on Science, Space and Technology
 Subcommittee on Technology and Innovation

Electoral history

Personal life
Cravaack has two sons. As of 2016, he taught social studies at Bishop Guertin High School, a Catholic College Preparatory School in Nashua, New Hampshire.

References

External links

 Congressman Chip Cravaack official U.S. House website (archived)
 Cravaack for Congress official campaign website (archived)
 
 

1959 births
21st-century American politicians
American people of German-Romanian descent
American people of Italian descent
Aviators from West Virginia
Commercial aviators
Living people
Military personnel from Charleston, West Virginia
Politicians from Charleston, West Virginia
Politicians from Cincinnati
People from Chisago County, Minnesota
Republican Party members of the United States House of Representatives from Minnesota
St. Xavier High School (Ohio) alumni
United States Naval Academy alumni
United States Naval Aviators
University of West Florida alumni
United States Navy reservists
Military personnel from Minnesota